Jesper Taaje (born 25 October 1997) is a Norwegian footballer who plays as a defender for Sandefjord.

Career
Hailing from Hemsedal, Taaje started his career with Hallingdal. In 2016, he moved to Oslo-based Kjelsås. After four years with Kjelsås, he joined HamKam in the summer of 2020. He stayed with HamKam for half a season, before moving to KFUM Oslo in 2021. In January 2022, he joined Sandefjord. On 3 April 2022, he made his Eliteserien debut in a 3–1 win against Haugesund.

References

External links

1997 births
Living people
People from Hemsedal
Association football defenders
Norwegian footballers
Kjelsås Fotball players
Hamarkameratene players
KFUM-Kameratene Oslo players
Sandefjord Fotball players
Norwegian Fourth Division players
Norwegian Third Division players
Norwegian Second Division players
Norwegian First Division players
Eliteserien players
Sportspeople from Viken (county)